Dictyonota is a genus of mostly European lace bugs in the  family Tingidae. There are more than 60 described species in Dictyonota.

Species
These 66 species belong to the genus Dictyonota:

 Dictyonota acalyptoides Golub, 1975
 Dictyonota aethiops Horvath, 1905
 Dictyonota albipennis Baerensprung, 1858
 Dictyonota aridula Jakovlev, 1902
 Dictyonota astragali Stusák and Önder, 1982
 Dictyonota atlantica Péricart, 1981
 Dictyonota atraphaxius Golub, 1975
 Dictyonota beckeri (Jakovlev, 1871)
 Dictyonota bishareenica (Linnavuori, 1965)
 Dictyonota brevicornis Ferrari, 1884
 Dictyonota coquereli Puton, 1876
 Dictyonota coriacea Asanova, 1970
 Dictyonota cretica Péricart, 1979
 Dictyonota dlabolai Hoberlandt, 1974
 Dictyonota eckerleini Péricart, 1979
 Dictyonota ephedrae (Kerzhner, 1964)
 Dictyonota froeschneri Rodrigues, 1970
 Dictyonota fuentei Puton, 1895
 Dictyonota fuliginosa Costa, 1855
 Dictyonota gobica Golub, 1975
 Dictyonota gracilicornis Puton, 1874
 Dictyonota guentheri (Wagner, 1967)
 Dictyonota halimodendri Golub, 1975
 Dictyonota henschi Puton, 1892
 Dictyonota hispanica (Gómez-Menor, 1955)
 Dictyonota horvathi (Kiritshenko, 1914)
 Dictyonota iberica Horvath, 1905
 Dictyonota inermis Golub, 1975
 Dictyonota josifovi (Seidenstücker, 1968)
 Dictyonota kerzhneri Golub, 1975
 Dictyonota koreana Lee, 1967
 Dictyonota lepida (Horváth, 1905)
 Dictyonota levantina Péricart, 1981
 Dictyonota lugubris Fieber, 1861
 Dictyonota marmorea Baerensprung, 1858
 Dictyonota marqueti Puton, 1879
 Dictyonota michaili Günther, 2008
 Dictyonota mitoris Drake and Hsiung, 1936
 Dictyonota moralesi Ribes, 1975
 Dictyonota nevadensis Gómez-Menor, 1955
 Dictyonota nigricosta (Kerzhner and Josifov, 1966)
 Dictyonota oblita Péricart, 1981
 Dictyonota opaca (Linnavuori, 1965)
 Dictyonota oromii Ribes, 1979
 Dictyonota pakistana Drake and Maldonado, 1959
 Dictyonota pardoi Ribes, 1975
 Dictyonota petrifracta Golub and Popov, 2000
 Dictyonota phoenicea Seidenstücker, 1963
 Dictyonota pulchella Costa, 1863
 Dictyonota pulchricornis (Kerzhner and Josifov, 1966)
 Dictyonota pusana Drake & Maa, 1955
 Dictyonota putonii Stål, 1874
 Dictyonota rectipilis (Asanova, 1970)
 Dictyonota reuteri Horvath, 1906
 Dictyonota ribesi Péricart, 1979
 Dictyonota salsolae Golub, 1975
 Dictyonota sareptana Jakovlev, 1876
 Dictyonota scutellaris Linnavuori, 1977
 Dictyonota sicardi (Puton, 1894)
 Dictyonota strichnocera Fieber, 1844
 Dictyonota teydensis Lindberg, 1936
 Dictyonota theryi (Montandon, 1897)
 Dictyonota tricornis (Schrank, 1801)
 Dictyonota vinokurovi Golub, 1979
 Dictyonota xilingola Jing, 1980
 † Dictyonota petrifacta Golub & Popov, 2000

References

Further reading

 
 
 
 
 

Tingidae